Monarchianism is a Christian theology that emphasizes God as one indivisible being, in direct contrast to Trinitarianism, which defines the Godhead as three coeternal, consubstantial, co-immanent, and equally divine hypostases.

History
During the patristic period, Christian theologians attempted to clarify the relationship between the Father, Son and Holy Spirit. Monarchianism developed in the 2nd century and persisted further into the 3rd century. Monarchianism (from the Greek monarkhia, meaning "ruling of one," and -ismos, meaning "practice or teaching") stresses the absolute, uncompromising unity of God in contrast to the doctrine of the Trinity, which is often lambasted as veiled tritheism by nontrinitarian Christians and other monotheists. 

Monarchians were opposed by Logos theologians (Tertullian, Hippolytus, Clement of Alexandria, and Origen of Alexandria). The Trinitarian view gained prominence and was adopted at the First Council of Constantinople in 381. Monarchianism was considered a heresy after the 4th century.

Types

Two types of monarchianism were propounded. Modalistic monarchianism (or Modalism) considers God to be one while appearing and working through the different "modes" of Father, Son, and Holy Spirit. Following this view, all the Godhead is understood to dwell in the person of Jesus from the incarnation. The terms "Father" and "Son" are then used to describe the distinction between the transcendence of God and the incarnation. Lastly, since God is understood as a Spirit in the context of the Gospel of John, it is held that the Holy Spirit should not be understood as a separate entity but rather as a mere descriptor of God's action. Notable adherents included Noetus, Praxeas, and Sabellius, hence why the view is commonly called Sabellianism. Nevertheless, Sabellius's writings did not survive, so the little known about his beliefs is from secondary sources.

Adoptionism (or dynamic monarchianism) holds that God is one being, above all else, wholly indivisible, and of one nature. It holds that the Son was not co-eternal with the Father, and that Jesus Christ was essentially granted godhood (adopted) for the plans of God and for his own perfect life and works. Different variations of Dynamism hold that Jesus was "adopted" either at the time of his baptism or his ascension. Notable adherents included Theodotus of Byzantium and Paul of Samosata, a bishop of Antioch. 

The name "Monarchian" properly does not strictly apply to the Adoptionists, or Dynamists, as they (the latter) "did not start from the monarchy of God, and their doctrine is strictly Christological".

See also

 Arianism
 Monarchian Prologue
 Monism
 Nicene Christianity
 Nontrinitarianism
 Oneness Pentecostalism
 Subordinationism
 Unitarianism

References

Sources

External links 
 

Nontrinitarianism
Christian terminology
Heresy in ancient Christianity
Nature of Jesus Christ